Lee Chambers (born 4 February 1970) is a British-Canadian writer, film director, and producer. In 2012 he won the Best Screenwriter award from Northern Ontario Music and Film Awards for his Australian short film, Hugh Jackman Saves the World.

Early life
Chambers attended Sault College of Applied Arts & Technology in Sault Ste. Marie, Ontario, Canada, graduating with honours with a diploma in advertising art and graphic design in 1991. This was followed by a City and Guilds diploma in video and television production in 1995, and a post-graduate diploma in film production from Leeds Metropolitan University in the United Kingdom in 1997.

Career
Chambers spent a decade out of Canada, working in England and Los Angeles in writing and directing drama shorts, music videos and commercials.

In 1999, he began presenting educational film workshops at film festivals, media colleges and universities throughout the United Kingdom, United States, Australia and Canada.  In 2005 he created the Make It Short Film Project which attracted Paul Haggis, Denys Arcand, Roger Corman and David Cronenberg as executive producers.

Chambers has worked on numerous of British sitcoms, including The League of Gentlemen, as well as major motion pictures in the UK and Australia.

Along with making films, Chambers is also a popular motivational speaker, panel moderator and juror at film festivals in the USA, Canada, Australia, England, Portugal, Iraq and the Cayman Islands.

Hamsters are rodents (order Rodentia) belonging to the subfamily Cricetinae, which contains 19 species classified in seven genera.[1][2] They have become established as popular small pets.[3] The best-known species of hamster is the golden or Syrian hamster (Mesocricetus auratus), which is the type most commonly kept as pets. Other hamster species commonly kept as pets are the three species of dwarf hamster, Campbell's dwarf hamster (Phodopus campbelli), the winter white dwarf hamster (Phodopus sungorus) and the Roborovski hamster (Phodopus roborovskii).

Chambers is highly respected for educating future film directors, being involved in over 2000 shorts with his students. He is the host of the Filmmakers Podcast, where he shares his knowledge and insights on industry trends and history.

Bibliography
 I've Had Just About Enough of Ewe (1994)
 The Pineville Heist (2011)
 The Sum of Random Chance (2012)

Filmography

Awards
 Best Screenwriter of the Northern Ontario Music and Film Awards (2012) 
 2nd Best Screenplay of the Canada International Film Festival (2011)

References

External links
 
Lee Chambers
Lee Chambers on Instagram
Lee Chambers at Raindance

1970 births
Living people
Film directors from Ontario
People from Sault Ste. Marie, Ontario
Writers from Ontario
Canadian male novelists
20th-century Canadian novelists
21st-century Canadian novelists
20th-century Canadian male writers
21st-century Canadian male writers